Saline County is located in the U.S. state of Arkansas. As of the 2020 census, the population was 123,416.  Its county seat and largest city is Benton. Saline County was formed on November 2, 1835, and named for the salt water (brine) springs in the area, despite a differing pronunciation from saline. Until November 2014, it was an alcohol prohibition or dry county.

Saline County is included in the Central Arkansas region.

Geography

Major highways
 Interstate 30
 Interstate 30 Business Loop
 Interstate 530
 U.S. Highway 65
 U.S. Highway 67
 U.S. Highway 70
 U.S. Highway 167
 Highway 5
 Highway 9
 Highway 35

Adjacent counties
Perry County (northwest)
Pulaski County (northeast)
Grant County (southeast)
Hot Spring County (southwest)
Garland County (west)

National protected area
 Ouachita National Forest (part)

Demographics

2020 census

As of the 2020 United States census, there were 123,416 people, 45,455 households, and 31,395 families residing in the county.

2000 census
As of the 2000 United States Census, there were 83,529 people, 31,778 households, and 24,500 families residing in the county. There were 33,825 housing units at an average density of 47 per square mile (18/km2). The racial makeup of the county was 95.27% White, 2.20% Black or African American, 0.49% Native American, 0.57% Asian, 0.03% Pacific Islander, 0.45% from other races, and 1.00% from two or more races.  1.30% of the population were Hispanic or Latino of any race.

There were 31,778 households, out of which 35.40% had children under the age of 18 living with them, 63.80% were married couples living together, 9.70% had a female householder with no husband present, and 22.90% were non-families. 19.60% of all households were made up of individuals, and 7.50% had someone living alone who was 65 years of age or older.  The average household size was 2.57 and the average family size was 2.94.

In the county, the population was spread out, with 25.50% under the age of 18, 7.70% from 18 to 24, 30.20% from 25 to 44, 24.20% from 45 to 64, and 12.50% who were 65 years of age or older.  The median age was 37 years. For every 100 females, there were 98.10 males.  For every 100 females age 18 and over, there were 95.30 males.

The median income for a household in the county was $42,569, and the median income for a family was $48,717. Males had a median income of $32,052 versus $23,294 for females. The per capita income for the county was $19,214.  About 5.00% of families and 7.20% of the population were below the poverty line, including 8.80% of those under age 18 and 7.30% of those age 65 or over.

Media 
The area is served online and in print by The Saline Courier.

Government
Over the past few election cycles Saline County has trended heavily towards the GOP. The last Democrat (as of 2020) to carry this county was Bill Clinton in 1996.

Communities

Cities
 Alexander
 Benton (county seat)
 Bryant
 Haskell
 Shannon Hills
 Traskwood

Town
 Bauxite

Census-designated places
 Avilla
 East End
 Hot Springs Village
 Salem
Sardis

Unincorporated communities
 Brooks
 Lakeside
 Owensville
 Paron

Townships

 Banner (contains most of East End)
 Bauxite (contains Bauxite, most of Benton)
 Beaver (contains Avilla, part of Bryant)
 Bryant (contains most of Alexander and Bryant, small parts of Benton and Shannon Hills)
 Dyer (contains part of Hot Springs Village)
 Fairplay
 Haskell (contains Haskell)
 Holland
 Hurricane (contains small part of East End)
 Jefferson
 Kentucky
 Liberty
 Marble (contains part of Hot Springs Village)
 Newcomb
 Otter (contains most of Shannon Hills, small parts of Alexander and East End)
 Owen (contains some of Bryant, small part of Alexander)
 Salem (contains Salem, small part of Bryant)
 Shaw
 Smith
 Traskwood (contains Traskwood)
 Union

Source:

See also
 List of lakes in Saline County, Arkansas
 National Register of Historic Places listings in Saline County, Arkansas
 Lanny Fite

References

External links

 Government
 Saline County Sheriff's Office
 General information
 
 Saline County, Arkansas at ARGenWeb (argenweb.net)
 Saline County at Encyclopedia of Arkansas History & Culture
 Saline County in the Civil War at The Historical Marker Database (HMdb.org)
 Saline County Library

 
1835 establishments in Arkansas Territory
Arkansas counties
Little Rock–North Little Rock–Conway metropolitan area
Populated places established in 1835